The nyala and the mountain nyala are African antelopes. The term Nyala may also refer to:

 Kuni-Muktar Mountain Nyala Sanctuary, a protected area and wildlife sanctuary in Ethiopia
 the Nyala tree, Xanthocercis zambesiaca, an African tree
 Nyala Stadium, a multi-use stadium in Addis Abeba, Ethiopia
 Nyala SC, an Ethiopian football club
 Nyala, Nevada, an unincorporated community in Nye County, Nevada, United States
 Nyala, Sudan
 Nyala Airport
 Nyala University
 RG-31 Nyala, an armoured vehicle
 Nyala, tribe, tribe of the Luhya people
 Nyala language (Luhya) (ISO 639-3: nle) – a Luhya language from Bantu group spoken in Kenya
 Nyala language (Sudan) (ISO 639-3: daj) – a Nilo-Saharan language spoken in Sudan
 Nyala (typeface), a font for Latin alphabet and Ge'ez script on Windows 7

People with the name Nyala
 Nyala Pema Dündul (1816–1872), a teacher of Buddhism in Eastern Tibet

See also
 Nayala Province, Burkina Faso
 Nyalas, a small town in Malaysia